Robert Noble (born 18 December 1945) is an English former footballer who played as a full back in the Football League for Manchester United.

Born in Reddish, Stockport, Noble signed for Manchester United as a trainee in 1961 and turned professional the following year. He made his Football League debut on 9 April 1966 in a 2–1 home defeat to Leicester City, and became a regular in the side that won the league title in 1967. but he was seriously injured in a car crash just before United sealed the title. He recovered from the injuries which almost claimed his life, but his attempts to recover full fitness proved unsuccessful and he retired from playing three years later.

References

1945 births
Living people
People from Reddish
English footballers
Association football defenders
Manchester United F.C. players
English Football League players